Tiroa is a rural locality in the Waitomo District and Manawatū-Whanganui region of New Zealand's North Island.  runs through the area. The name means "tall cabbage tree".

Pao Mīere, a Māori prophetic movement, built a cross-shaped whare wānanga (house of learning) called Te Miringa Te Kakara near Tiroa about 1887. It was destroyed by fire in 1983.

Tiroa School operated from about 1900 with the buildings replaced in 1925. The school was open at least until 1958.

Demographics

Tiroa had a population of 42 at the 2018 New Zealand census, a decrease of 9 people (−17.6%) since the 2013 census, and a decrease of 42 people (−50.0%) since the 2006 census. There were 18 households, comprising 27 males and 18 females, giving a sex ratio of 1.5 males per female. The median age was 26.8 years (compared with 37.4 years nationally), with 6 people (14.3%) aged under 15 years, 15 (35.7%) aged 15 to 29, 21 (50.0%) aged 30 to 64, and 3 (7.1%) aged 65 or older.

Ethnicities were 57.1% European/Pākehā, 50.0% Māori, 7.1% Pacific peoples, and 7.1% Asian. People may identify with more than one ethnicity.

The percentage of people born overseas was 14.3, compared with 27.1% nationally.

Although some people chose not to answer the census's question about religious affiliation, 57.1% had no religion, 21.4% were Christian, and 14.3% had Māori religious beliefs.

Of those at least 15 years old, 9 (25.0%) people had a bachelor's or higher degree, and 9 (25.0%) people had no formal qualifications. The median income was $36,200, compared with $31,800 nationally. 3 people (8.3%) earned over $70,000 compared to 17.2% nationally. The employment status of those at least 15 was that 27 (75.0%) people were employed full-time, and 3 (8.3%) were part-time.

References

Waitomo District
Populated places in Manawatū-Whanganui